South Korean boy band, Treasure, encapsulates a discography of one studio album, two extended plays, three single album, six singles, and two soundtrack appearances. In the first five months of its career, the band sold over one million physical albums, and recorded a platinum certification in South Korea by the Korea Music Copyright Association (KMCA) for all of its releases.

Albums

Studio albums

Single albums

Extended plays

Singles

Other charted songs

Soundtrack appearances

Videography

Music videos

Other videos

Other releases

Notes

References 

Discographies of South Korean artists
K-pop discographies